The last word is a gin-based Prohibition-era cocktail originally developed at the Detroit Athletic Club. While the drink eventually fell out of favor, it enjoyed a renewed popularity after being rediscovered by the bartender Murray Stenson in 2004 during his tenure at the Zig Zag Café and becoming a cult hit in the Seattle area.

Original recipe and variations 
The Last Word consists of equal amounts of gin, green Chartreuse, maraschino liqueur and freshly pressed lime juice, which are combined in a shaker with ice. After shaking, the mix is poured through a cocktail strainer (sieve) into the glass so that the cocktail contains no ice and is served straight up.

The cocktail has a pale greenish color, primarily due to the Chartreuse. Audrey Saunders of the Pegu Bar in New York City considers it one of her bar's best cocktails and describes its taste as follows:

The taste may also vary slightly depending on the brand of gin being used. The original cocktail at the Detroit Athletic Club during the Prohibition era used bathtub gin, and even today the club is using its own recreation of "Prohibition era bathtub gin" (vodka, spices, herbs, citrus) for it. Some variations of the cocktail have sprung up, which usually replace the gin with another base liquor and sometimes switch the limes for lemons. A particularly well-known variation is the Final Ward, created by the New York bartender Phil Ward, who replaced the gin with rye whiskey and the lime juice with lemon juice.

Rick Dobbs adapted the Last Word by substituting smoky mezcal for gin, emphasizing the earthy, savoury taste of mezcal. He named the drink Last of The Oaxacans.

History 

The first publication in which the Last Word appeared was Ted Saucier's 1951 cocktail book Bottoms Up!. In it, Saucier states that the cocktail was first served around 30 years earlier at the Detroit Athletic Club and later introduced in New York by Frank Fogarty. Since this dates the creation of the drink to the first years of the prohibition (1919-1933), it is usually considered a prohibition era drink. A research in the archives of the Detroit Athletic Club by St. John Frizell revealed later that the drink was slightly older predating the prohibition era by a few years. It was already offered on the club's 1916 menu for a price of 35 cents (about $8.22 in 2019 currency) making it the club's most expensive cocktail at the time.

Fogarty himself was no bartender but one of the best known vaudevillian monologists (roughly comparable to today's stand-up comedians) of his time. Some assume that this occupation gave rise to the cocktail's name. Nicknamed the "Dublin minstrel" Fogarty often opened his performance with a song and ended it with a serious heartthrob recitation. In 1912 he won the New York Morning Telegraph contest for the best vaudeville artist and in 1914 he was elected president of The White Rats (vaudeville actors union). Around the time the cocktail was presumably created, Fogarty performed at the Temple theater in Detroit.

The cocktail however fell into oblivion sometime after World War II until it was rediscovered by Murray Stenson in 2004. Stenson was looking for a new cocktail for the Zig Zag Cafe in Seattle, when he came across an old 1952 copy of Saucier's book. Soon after being offered at the Zig Zag Cafe it became somewhat of cult hit in the Seattle and Portland areas and spread to cocktail bars in major cities worldwide. It also spawned several variations with The Final Ward probably being the best known among them. In addition its recipe reappeared in newer cocktail guides including the 2009 edition of the Mr. Boston Official Bartender's Guide.

On May 20, 2011 Rachel Maddow demonstrated the preparation of the cocktail in her show on MSNBC and called it the "last word for the end of the world". This was meant as an ironic comment on the rapture and end of world prediction of the Christian radio host Harold Camping and in reference to the MSBNC news program The Last Word with Lawrence O'Donnell, which covered Camping's predictions extensively.

See also

 List of cocktails

Notes

Further reading
 Ted Saucier: Bottoms Up!: With Illustrations by Twelve of America's Most Distinguished Artists. Greystone Press, New York, 1951. (Reprint Martino, Eastford, CT, 2011, .)
 Neal McLennan: "Barfly: The Last Word". Vancouver Magazine, 2011-11-1.

External links
 

Cocktails with gin
Cocktails with chartreuse
Cocktails with lime juice
Cocktails with fruit liqueur